Marek Krajewski (born 4 September 1966, in Wrocław) is a Polish crime writer and linguist.

He is best known for his series of novels set in pre-war Wrocław (which was, at the time, Breslau) with the policeman Eberhard Mock as the protagonist. These novels have been translated into 18 languages: English, Spanish, French, German, Italian, Dutch, Hebrew, and Russian among others.

Life and career
He was born on 4 September 1966 in Wrocław, Polish People's Republic. In 1985, he graduated from the Juliusz Słowacki High School No. 9 in Wrocław. Between 1985 and 1991 he studied classics at the University of Wrocław. In 1992, he obtained an MA degree and in 1999, he received a doctoral degree. He worked as a librarian and later as an assistant professor and lecturer at the Institute of Classical Philology and Ancient Culture of the University of Wrocław. Since 2007, he has focused on pursuing his professional career as a writer of primarily crime fiction.

In 2005, he was the recipient of the Paszport Polityki Award presented by the Polityka magazine. His other awards include the High Calibre Award (Polish: Nagroda Wielkiego Kalibru), the Witryna Award conferred by Polish booksellers and the Book Institute Award for best Polish crime novel. In 2015, he was awarded Silver Medal for Merit to Culture – Gloria Artis. In 2016, he also won the Georg Dehio Book Prize – a prize which recognizes authors who "in their literary, scholarly or public work, address the themes of the common culture and history of the German people and their Eastern neighbors at a high level and from a broad perspective."

In 2018, Polish filmmaker Patryk Vega directed a crime thriller The Plagues of Breslau, which is loosely based on a series of crime novels by Krajewski.

Novels

Eberhard Mock series
 Death in Breslau (Śmierć w Breslau), 1999, . English edition: MacLehose Press/Quercus, London 2008; Melville House, New York, 2012,  
 The End of the World in Breslau (Koniec świata w Breslau), 2003. English edition: MacLehose Press/Quercus, London 2009; Melville House, New York, 2013,  
 Phantoms in Breslau (Widma w mieście Breslau), 2005. English edition: MacLehose Press/Quercus, London 2010.
 Fortress Breslau (Festung Breslau), 2006
 Plague in Breslau (Dżuma w Breslau), 2007
 The Minotaur's Head (Głowa Minotaura), 2009. English edition: MacLehose Press/Quercus, London 2012.
 Mock, 2016
 The Human Zoo (Ludzkie zoo), 2017
 The Duel (Pojedynek), 2018
 Golem, 2019
 Moloch, 2020

Jarosław Pater series
 Suicide Avenue (Aleja samobójców), 2008
 Cemetery Roses (Róże cmentarne), 2009

Edward Popielski series
 The Minotaur's Head (Głowa Minotaura), 2009. English edition: MacLehose Press/Quercus, London 2012.
 Erinyes (Erynie), 2010
 Charon's Numbers (Liczby Charona) 2011
 The Rivers of Hades (Rzeki Hadesu) 2012
 In the Depths of Darkness (W otchłani mroku), 2013
 The Lord of the Numbers (Władca liczb), 2014
 The Arena of Rats (Arena szczurów), 2015
 The Girl with Four Fingers (Dziewczyna o czterech palcach), 2019
 The Executioner's Assistant (Pomocnik kata), 2020

Other
 The Dead Have a Voice (Umarli mają głos), co-written with Jerzy Kawecki, 2015

See also 
 Eberhard Mock
 Breslau
 List of Polish writers
 List of Poles
 Polish literature

References

External links 
 Marek Krajewski webpage (in Polish)
 W otchłani mroku / In the Depths of Darkness - review

Polish crime writers
Polish crime fiction writers
1966 births
Living people
Writers of historical mysteries
20th-century Polish writers
21st-century Polish writers
20th-century Polish male writers
People from Wrocław